Pärnu Postimees (originally Perno Postimees ehk Näddalileht) is an Estonian regional newspaper published in Pärnu County. First published on 5 June 1857, it is one of the oldest papers in the country, and also a forerunner to the national newspaper Postimees.

History

The newspaper was first published on 5 June 1857 as Perno Postimees ehk Näddalileht. It was founded by Johann Voldemar Jannsen, who was an architect by profession and has been described as "the father or Estonian journalism".

The paper aimed at encouraging Estonians and at publishing Estonian literary work. In 1863, the paper moved to Dorpat (Tartu) and was renamed as Eesti Postimees (meaning the Estonian Postman in English).

References

External links
 

1857 establishments in Estonia
Publications established in 1857
Newspapers published in Estonia
Estonian-language newspapers
Mass media in Pärnu